Constantine "Gene" Mako (January 24, 1916 – June 14, 2013) was an American tennis player and art gallery owner. He was born in Budapest, capital of Hungary. He won four Grand Slam doubles titles in the 1930s. Mako was inducted into the International Tennis Hall of Fame in Newport, Rhode Island in 1973.

Early life
His father Bartholomew Mako graduated from the Budapest Academy of Fine Arts in 1914. He started to work as a draftsman for his mentor Viktor Madarász. He was an avid soccer player himself. He fought in World War I. After the war, he left Hungary with his wife, Georgina Elizabeth Farkas Mako  and only son, traveling first to Italy, then stopping for three years in Buenos Aires, Argentina, then settled in Los Angeles, California. There he created works for public places like churches, libraries and post offices. Gene attended Glendale High School and the University of Southern California, and he was offered a Hungarian University Scholarship in the meantime. He quit before graduation.

Tennis career
In 1934. he won the NCAA  championships in singles and the doubles (with Phillip Caslin) while playing for the University of Southern California where he lettered at USC for three years (1934-36-37). He also won the boys' singles event at the U.S. National Championships in 1932 and 1934 and the boys' doubles in 1932, 1933 and 1934.

Mako was especially successful as a doubles player with his partner and friend Don Budge. They competed in seven Grand Slam finals, four of which they won.
In 1936 Gene Mako and Alice Marble won the finals at the US Mixed Doubles Championships against Sarah Palfrey and Don Budge (6:3 and 6:2). They won the Newport Casino Invitational Tournament three consecutive times from 1936 to 1938.

From 1935 to 1938. Mako was a member of the United States Davis Cup team and played in eight ties. The US team won the Davis Cup in 1937, defeating the United Kingdom in the final at Wimbledon, and in 1938 in the final against Australia at the Germantown Cricket Club in Philadelphia. As a Davis Cup player he compiled a record of six wins and three losses.

Mako was in the U.S. top 10 in 1937 and 1938 (reaching as high as No. 3), and was ranked World No. 8 by A. Wallis Myers of The Daily Telegraph in 1938. That year, he reached the U.S. final at Forest Hills against his doubles partner Don Budge, who was in pursuit of the first Grand Slam.

In 1939. he was suspended and banned from playing for breaching the amateur rules. He and Don Budge allegedly accepted a sum of 20A£ for an exhibition match in Australia, which was against amateurism. Afterwards he continued to play tennis at that time during the Second World War while serving in the Navy. He also played professional basketball while stationed in Norfolk, Virginia.

In 1973 Mako was inducted into the International Tennis Hall of Fame. In 1999, he was elected to the University of Southern California Athletic Hall of Fame.

Playing style
He possessed strong serve and powerful smashes but due to several injuries in his career, he had to give up his power game. He preferred a volleying style, which he perfected with quickness, good angle selection and pacing paired with strategy.

Personal life
Apart from being a sportsman, Mako composed music in his early 20s. He's the author of two songs, namely "Lovely as Spring" and "What Did You Dream Last Night?". He also starred in the 1938 musical Happy Landing and the 1941 war comedy Caught in the Draft, although he remained uncredited in both movies. Mako married actress Laura Mae Church in Manhattan in 1941. A month later, World War II broke out, and he joined the United States Navy. After this, he worked in a broadcasting studio. After his retirement, he designed tennis courts. His wife worked as an interior designer. He was involved in wrestling and was hired as a coach at the California Institute of Technology while also coaching the basketball team. He owned Gene Mako Galleries in Los Angeles, California. He also published a book about his father titled Bartholomew Mako: A Hungarian Master, 1890-1970. In the final decade of his life, he taught art. He died in 2013 at Cedars-Sinai Medical Center in Los Angeles, aged 97, of pneumonia.

Grand Slam finals

Singles (1 runner-up)

Doubles (4 titles, 3 runners-up)

References

External links 
 
 
 
 
 
 Find a Grave

American art dealers
American male tennis players
Hungarian expatriates in Argentina
Hungarian emigrants to the United States
International Tennis Hall of Fame inductees
Tennis players from Los Angeles
United States National champions (tennis)
USC Trojans men's tennis players
Caltech Beavers wrestling coaches
Caltech Beavers men's basketball coaches
Wimbledon champions (pre-Open Era)
1916 births
2013 deaths
Deaths from pneumonia in California
Tennis players from Budapest
Grand Slam (tennis) champions in mixed doubles
Grand Slam (tennis) champions in men's doubles
Hungarian University of Fine Arts alumni
Glendale High School (Glendale, California) alumni
Professional tennis players before the Open Era
Burials at Holy Cross Cemetery, Culver City